Marco Sullivan (born April 27, 1980) is a former World Cup alpine ski racer from the United States.  Born in Truckee, California, he competed primarily in the speed events of Downhill and Super G.

Sullivan competed in the 2002 and 2010 Winter Olympics, and four World Championships. He won one World Cup race, a downhill in Chamonix, France, in January 2008.

World Cup
Sullivan made his World Cup debut in December 2001, and took one victory, the renowned downhill in Chamonix, France, on January 26, 2008. He won the race in 2:00.11, ahead of Swiss star Didier Cuche.

In early December 2003, Sullivan injured his knee in a downhill training run at Beaver Creek. It happened at the last jump of the Birds of Prey course and caused him to miss the rest of the 2004 season. While training in France in October 2004, Sullivan injured the same knee again and was out for the 2005 season as well.

Sullivan attained his first World Cup podium on November 24, 2007, when he finished second at the season's first downhill at Lake Louise, a good-for-gliders course in the Canadian Rockies. His victory at Chamonix came two months later, and he went on to finish fourth in the World Cup downhill standings, the best seasonal result of his career.

In late December 2010, Sullivan crashed during a training run on the Stelvio course at Bormio, Italy   (video). He sustained a concussion which ended his 2011 season, including the World Championships. After two months, he was cleared by doctors to get back on skis in early March.

Season standings

Top ten finishes
 1 win – (1 DH)
 4 podiums – (4 DH)

World Championship results

Sullivan took a bronze medal at the Junior World Championships in 2000 in the slalom. He first raced in the World Championships in 2003 and finished 17th in the Super-G and 24th in the Downhill. He missed the 2005 and 2011 events due to injury.

Olympic results  

In his Olympic debut in the downhill in 2002, Sullivan finished a surprising ninth on the Grizzly course at Snowbasin, Utah. He was the 31st racer out of the starting gate and was the sole North American among  the top fifteen finishers.

U.S. Ski Championships
Sullivan was the Downhill champion at the U.S. Alpine Championships in 2007 in the Alyeska Resort in Alaska; he finished more than a full second ahead of runner-up Erik Fisher. He won three national titles in total, having previously won the super-G at Squaw Valley in 2002 and going on to win another downhill championship at Alyeska in 2009.

Arctic Man
Sullivan and his partner Tyler Akelstad are five-time champions in the extreme ski/snowmachine race in Alaska - Arctic Man. Sullivan and Akelstad hold the record for the men's ski division, having completed the race with a time of 03:52.72. This was the first time that the four minute threshold was broken.

Movies
 The People vs. Brad Holmes, 2007.
 Appeared in Children of Winter with fellow Olympian Seth Wescott skiing in Cordova, Alaska, at Points North Heli in 2009.
 Appeared in the Kings and Corn segment of Warren Miller's Flow State in 2012 alongside fellow Olympians Daron Rahlves and Tommy Moe.

SKI Magazine column
During the 2012 season, Sullivan has written columns for SKI mag.com, giving insight to life on the World Cup circuit, which includes spending Christmas in Bormio.

References

External links
 
 Marco Sullivan World Cup standings at the International Ski Federation
 
 
 
 U.S. Ski Team.com – profile – Marco Sullivan

People from Truckee, California
American male alpine skiers
Alpine skiers at the 2002 Winter Olympics
Alpine skiers at the 2006 Winter Olympics
Alpine skiers at the 2010 Winter Olympics
Alpine skiers at the 2014 Winter Olympics
Olympic alpine skiers of the United States
Sportspeople from California
1980 births
Living people
People from Olympic Valley, California